The 1936 All-Ireland Senior Hurling Championship Final was the 49th All-Ireland Final and the culmination of the 1936 All-Ireland Senior Hurling Championship, an inter-county hurling tournament for the top teams in Ireland. The match was held at Croke Park, Dublin, on 6 September 1936, between Limerick and Kilkenny. The Leinster champions lost to their Munster opponents on a score line of 5-6 to 1-5.

Match details

1
All-Ireland Senior Hurling Championship Finals
Kilkenny GAA matches
Limerick GAA matches
All-Ireland Senior Hurling Championship Final
All-Ireland Senior Hurling Championship Final, 1936